= KL-50 =

Identifiers
CAS Number	1161826-19-2
3D model (JSmol)	Interactive image
PubChem CID	44128812
- InChI: InChI=1S/C7H7FN6O2/c8-1-2-14-7(16)13-3-10-4(5(9)15)6(13)11-12-14/h3H,1-2H2,(H2,9,15) Key: RXJOSBAVDXNQEY-UHFFFAOYSA-N
- SMILES: FCCN1N=NC2=C(C(=O)N)N=CN2C(=O)1

Properties
Chemical formula	C_{7}H_{7}FN_{6}O_{2}
Molar mass	226.171 g·mol^{−1}
- Except where otherwise noted, data are given for materials in their standard state (at 25 °C [77 °F], 100 kPa). Infobox references

KL-50 (also known as RR-004 by its developer Pharminox Limited) is a drug candidate designed to treat glioblastoma. It functions by alkylating DNA yielding O6-(2-fluoroethyl)guanine which causes DNA interstrand crosslinks. Half of the cancers are unable to repair the DNA damage.

The KL-50 molecule was patented by Pharminox Limited in 2013, detailing its potential use in treating MMR-/MGMT- gliomas.
